Hot House Flowers is an album by Wynton Marsalis that won the Grammy Award for Best Jazz Instrumental Performance, Soloist in 1985. The album peaked at number 90 on the Billboard 200, number 53 on the Billboard R&B Albums chart, and number 1 on the Top Jazz Albums chart.

Track listing

Personnel
 Wynton Marsalis – trumpet
 Branford Marsalis – soprano and tenor saxophones
 Kent Jordan – alto flute
 Paul McCandless - oboe, English horn
 Andrew Schwartz - bassoon
 Peter Gordon - French horn
 Tony Price - tuba
 Kenny Kirkland – piano
 Ron Carter – double bass
 Jeff "Tain" Watts – drums
 Charles Libove (concertmaster), Ingrid Arden, Peter Dimitriades, Gayle Dixon, Guillermo Figueroa, Winterton Garvey, Harry Glickman, Regis Iandiorio, Ray Kunicki, Patmore Lewis, Diane Monroe, Louann Montesi - violins
 Al Brown, Theodore Israel, Mitsue Takayama, Harry Zaratzian - violas
 Seymour Barab, Richard Locker, Alvin McCall, Frederick Zlotkin - cellos
 Bob Freedman - arranger, orchestrator and conductor

References

1984 albums
Albums produced by George Butler (record producer)
Columbia Records albums
Wynton Marsalis albums